David Hopcraft John Morgan (30 July 1937 – 17 June 2020), known as David (H. J.) Morgan, was a British sociologist, who was President of the British Sociological Association (1997–1999) and editor of the association's journal Sociology. His research focused on family sociology, gender studies and especially men's studies.

Morgan was Professor of Sociology at the University of Manchester, where he taught sociology from 1964, and where the Morgan Centre for the Study of Relationships and Personal Life is named in his honour. He also held Visiting Professorships at Keele University and the Norwegian University of Science and Technology. He was co-editor of the Palgrave Studies in Family Sociology book series.

He died on 17 June 2020 at the age of 82.

Selected publications

See also
Morgan Centre for the Study of Relationships and Personal Life, Arthur Lewis Building
Professor Carol Smart, co-director of the Morgan Centre for the Study of Relationships and Personal Life
Dame Janet Finch
University of Manchester

References

British sociologists
Men and masculinities scholars
Academics of the University of Manchester
Academics of Keele University
Academic staff of the Norwegian University of Science and Technology
1937 births
2020 deaths
Presidents of the British Sociological Association
Family sociologists